Dun-les-Places is a commune in the Nièvre department in central France. It is one of the martyred villages of the Liberation in 1944.

Demographics
On 1 January 2019, the estimated population was 353.

History

During World War II, British Special Air Service units and French Resistance groups in the surrounding region carried out a campaign of harassment and sabotage against the occupying Germans.

On 24 June, the nearby villages of Montsauche and Planchez were destroyed by the Germans. Late on 26 June, a group of Gestapo and militia arrived in the village. Eighteen men were arrested and brought to the church for a so-called "document check". They were joined by the village priest.  The men were questioned in the nearby hotel about the presence of Maquis in the region, despite the presence in the area of the Maquis, no information was given. The women and children remaining in their homes were terrorized.

At 10pm, during an electricity blackout and a storm, gunfire was heard in the village. The Germans vandalised the village and stole wine and all the food they could find. On 27 June, the village was systematically looted; the Germans took linen, bedding and valuables after shooting pigs, sheep and poultry. Early on 28 June, the Germans prepared to leave and used flamethrowers, grenades and incendiary logs to set fire to the houses. The survivors then discovered the bodies of the hostages lying on the porch of the church. The priest's body, partially unclothed, was discovered in the tower (he had, reportedly, been hung from his belfrey, then cut down). Other bodies were found on the road or in neighbouring villages. The massacre took 27 victims, whose funeral was on 1 July 1944.

A small party of Maquisards and SAS passed through the village twice around this time, without encountering Germans.    This is disputed in the book 'Danger Has No Face' by James Hutchison, which claims that the Chevriere Maquis and SAS engaged in a fierce firefight with the Germans between Dun-les-Places and Vermot in the Bois du Chevriere as part of "Mission Verveine".

A makeshift Maquis hospital at a local chateau was attacked and burnt while both Maquis and SAS troopers engaged the enemy inflicting 30+ casualties on the Germans. All wounded Maquis and SAS in the hospital were safely evacuated further south-west into the heavily wooded area.

See also
Communes of the Nièvre department
Parc naturel régional du Morvan

References

Communes of Nièvre
Collective punishment
Massacres in France
Nazi war crimes in France
Mass murder in 1944